Claude Phillip (born 10 November 1942) is a Trinidadian cricketer. He played in twenty-three first-class matches for Trinidad and Tobago from 1969 to 1979.

See also
 List of Trinidadian representative cricketers

References

External links
 

1942 births
Living people
Trinidad and Tobago cricketers